Rem Pitlick (born April 2, 1997) is a Canadian-born American professional ice hockey center for the  Montreal Canadiens of the National Hockey League (NHL). Pitlick has previously played for the Nashville Predators and Minnesota Wild of the National Hockey League (NHL).

Prior to turning professional, Pitlick played for the Muskegon Lumberjacks and Waterloo Black Hawks in the United States Hockey League (USHL). In 2016, he set a franchise record with the Lumberjacks for most points in a season and was awarded the USHL Player of the Year, USHL Forward of the Year, and Dave Tyler Junior Player of the Year Award. Following his successful junior career, Pitlick joined the University of Minnesota where he was selected for the All-Big Ten Freshman Team and First Team. His father, Lance Pitlick, played in the NHL for the Ottawa Senators and Florida Panthers.

Playing career

Amateur
In August 2013, Pitlick committed to play Division I college ice hockey for the Minnesota Golden Gophers.

Pitlick played for the Muskegon Lumberjacks and Waterloo Black Hawks in the United States Hockey League (USHL) for two years. After spending the 2014–15 season with the Black Hawks, he was traded to the Lumberjacks in exchange for a first and tenth round pick in the USHL Draft. During the 2015–16 season, while with the Lumberjacks, Pitlick set a new franchise record for most points in a season and was awarded USHL Player of the Year and USHL Forward of the Year. He was also named to the First Team All-USHL and given the Dave Tyler Junior Player of the Year Award. At the end of the season, Pitlick announced he was leaving the USHL to join the Golden Gophers for the 2016–17 season.

Collegiate
In his freshman season with the Golden Gophers, Pitlick played in 36 games and recorded 32 points. He scored his first collegiate goal on October 7, 2016, in a 6–0 win over the Alaska Anchorage Seawolves. At the conclusion of the season, Pitlick was selected for the Big Ten All-Freshman Team.

In his sophomore season, Pitlick played in 38 games and recorded 31 points. He also recorded an eight-game point streak between October 27 and November 18. At the conclusion of the season, Pitlick was selected for the Academic All-Big Ten team.

In his junior season, Pitlick played in 38 games and set a new career high in points with 45 points. He was named the Big Ten First Star of The Week after he recorded five points in a weekend series against the Michigan Wolverines. He ended the season as a Hobey Baker Award nominee and selected for the All-Big Ten First Team. On March 12, Pitlick was named to the AHCA First-Team All-American, becoming the 65th person to earn All-American honors in Minnesota history.

Professional

Nashville Predators 
Pitlick signed a two-year entry level contract with the Nashville Predators on March 22, 2019, thus concluding his collegiate career. He made his NHL debut on March 25, against the Minnesota Wild.

Minnesota Wild 
After attending the Predators 2021 training camp, prior to being reassigned to the AHL to begin the  season, Pitlick was claimed off waivers by the Minnesota Wild on October 6, 2021. In his fifth game with the Wild on November 13, 2021, Pitlick scored his first three NHL goals with a natural hat trick, securing a win over the Seattle Kraken.

Montreal Canadiens 
On January 11 2022, Pitlick was placed on waivers by the Wild and was then claimed the next day by the Montreal Canadiens. He made an immediate impact on arrival in Montreal, in the midst of what was a historically poor season for the team, registering six points in his first seven games and almost double the average ice time he had with the Wild. At the end of the season, Pitlick registered 9 goals, and 17 assists for 27 points with the Canadiens.

After initially testing free agency, Pitlick was re-signed to a two-year, $2.2 million contract extension with the Canadiens on July 16, 2022. However, he struggled early in the next season, amidst a logjam of forwards in the Canadiens roster. He dressed for seven of the team's first twelve games, registering no points. On November 7, with fellow forward Evgeni Dadonov scheduled to return to the roster from injured reserve, it was announced that Pitlick was being put on waivers.  After injuries to several starting players, Pitlick returned to the line up.  In a memorable game against Toronto on January 21, 2023 Pitlick scored in overtime in three-on-three play to win the match for Montreal.

International play
Pitlick has represented Team USA at the 2015 World Junior A Challenge.

Personal life
Pitlick was born in Ottawa, Ontario when his father, Lance was a member of the Ottawa Senators and is a dual citizen of both Canada and the United States.

His cousin Tyler Pitlick is also an NHL player; he currently plays for the St. Louis Blues. His younger brother, Rhett, was drafted by the Montreal Canadiens in the fifth round of the 2019 NHL Entry Draft. Rhett plays NCAA hockey for the University of Minnesota; played high school hockey for Chaska High School.

His mother Lisa is also a former athlete. She attended the University of Minnesota and competed on Team USA's gymnastics team.

Career statistics

Awards and honors

References

External links

1997 births
Living people
AHCA Division I men's ice hockey All-Americans
American men's ice hockey centers
Chicago Wolves players
Ice hockey players from Minnesota
Ice hockey people from Ottawa
Laval Rocket players
Milwaukee Admirals players
Minnesota Golden Gophers men's ice hockey players
Minnesota Wild players
Montreal Canadiens players
Muskegon Lumberjacks players
Nashville Predators draft picks
Nashville Predators players
People from Plymouth, Minnesota
Waterloo Black Hawks players